Marcel Haščák  (born 3 February 1987) is a Slovak ice hockey player who is currently playing for HC Slovan Bratislava in the Slovak Extraliga.

Career

Slovakia
Haščák played junior ice hockey for his hometown club HK Poprad. He debuted at senior level in the 2005–06 season. In the 2007–08 season he earned 39 points and finished 5th in club stats. After 5 seasons for HK Poprad he signed a contract for HC Košice. He won the Slovak Extraliga title for Košice in the 2010–11 season, earning 31 points in the regular season and 4 points in the playoffs.

Leaving Slovakia
Haščák joined Dinamo Riga on try-out in August 2013. On August 21, 2013, Haščák signed one-year contract with Dinamo Riga.

International play
Haščák was a part of the silver medal winning team at the 2012 IIHF World Championship.

Career statistics

Regular season and playoffs
Bold indicates led league

International

Awards and honors

References

External links

1987 births
Living people
Sportspeople from Poprad
Slovak ice hockey right wingers
Amur Khabarovsk players
HC Karlovy Vary players
HC Kometa Brno players
HC Slovan Bratislava players
HK Poprad players
HC Košice players
Dinamo Riga players
Ice hockey players at the 2018 Winter Olympics
Olympic ice hockey players of Slovakia
Slovak expatriate ice hockey players in Russia
Slovak expatriate ice hockey players in the Czech Republic
Expatriate ice hockey players in Latvia
Slovak expatriate sportspeople in Latvia